Eurovision 2010 could refer to:

 Eurovision Song Contest 2010, the fifty-fifth Eurovision Song Contest that was held in May 2010
 Junior Eurovision Song Contest 2010, the eighth Junior Eurovision Song Contest that was held in November 2010
 Third Eurovision Dance Contest, which was originally postponed to 2010